Østerild Wind Turbine Test Field (alternatively Risø) is a facility managed by the DTU Risø Campus of the Technical University of Denmark (DTU) for testing of offshore wind turbines with a pinnacle height up to  near Thisted-Østerild, Denmark.

History
The area was plagued by flying sand from about 1450, and a plantation was started from 1889 to keep the sand in check.

The international IEC 61400 standard specifies how to design and validate wind turbines to gain commercial value. A suitable area for testing wind turbines must have good wind, a specific surface roughness, a clear area around the site, and not be in an EU Special Protection Area. After investigating 17 areas and drawing criticism, the Folketing decided in June 2010 to establish a wind turbine test center at Østerild. It was inaugurated in 2012, and is popular among tourists. A visitor center opened in 2017, and had 50,000 visitors in 2020. There is a 50kW charging station. The current turbines reached a height of 240 metres in 2020, but future turbines up to 400 metres cannot be accommodated. 

New ponds and open areas have improved conditions for bats. The first sea eagles came to the area in 2015.

On October 10, 2022, the prototype of the offshore wind turbine SG 14-222 DD produced up to 359 MWh of electricity in 24 hours, beating a new world record.

In December 2022, a 15 MW prototype was installed.

Description
There are 9 test stands, and each test stand has its own meteorological mast due west. Some of the first 7 stands were not yet put in use in 2015. In 2016, the wind turbine industry requested more stands to fulfill future test requirements. The turbines are not permanent, but spend some months in test at the site before being replaced by the next turbines.

At the northern and the southern end of the test field, there are two 250 metre tall guyed masts equipped with lamps to warn aircraft.

List of sites
Test sites as of December 2015 :

Gallery

See also 

 Wind power in Denmark
 List of tallest structures in Denmark

References

External links 

 Østerild - National Test Centre for Large Wind Turbines, DTU page
 National Testing Centre for Large Wind Turbines in Østerild, tourist page 
 Environmental papers
 Brochure
 Current weather measurements

Wind farms in Denmark
Wind turbines